New Spicer Meadow Reservoir is a reservoir in the Sierra Nevada, within the Stanislaus National Forest in eastern Tuolumne County, California.

Water and power
The  reservoir is formed by New Spicer Meadow Dam on Highland Creek, a tributary of the Stanislaus River. Additional water is diverted from the North Fork of the Stanislaus River by the North Fork Diversion Dam and a two-mile (3 km) tunnel. 

Downstream from the dam and reservoir, the water continues flowing in Highland Creek until its confluence with the North Fork of the Stanislaus River.

Calaveras County Water District owns the dam. Water from the reservoir supplies drinking water and water for recreation and irrigation. Also, along with the Northern California Power Agency, the water district sells electricity from the 5.5-MW hydroelectric plant at the base of the dam. They also operate the 253-MW Collierville Powerhouse on the North Fork of the Stanislaus River.

See also
List of dams and reservoirs in California

References
California State Water Resources Control Board
Northern California Power Agency

Reservoirs in Tuolumne County, California
Stanislaus River
Lakes of the Sierra Nevada (United States)
Stanislaus National Forest
Reservoirs in Northern California